Council Skies is the upcoming fourth studio album by English rock band Noel Gallagher's High Flying Birds. Produced by Gallagher and longtime engineer Paul Stacey, it is set to be released on 2 June 2023, through Gallagher's label Sour Mash Records. It will be the first album Gallagher has recorded in his own recording studio: Lone Star Studios with string sessions taking place at Abbey Road Studios in April 2022. Two singles have been released from the album so far: "Pretty Boy" and "Easy Now".

Background
Gallagher began demoing the album in late 2021 with sessions commencing at Lone Star Studios in January 2022. Johnny Marr features on three tracks on the album, including lead single: "Pretty Boy".

Gallagher has described the album as "going back to the beginning. Daydreaming, looking up at the sky and wondering about what life could be…". The artwork is taken by Kevin Cummins and features the band's live equipment set up on the original centre spot of where Maine Road Football Stadium once stood. When discussing the album title, Gallagher said "The title comes from a book by the artist Pete McKee. I was writing the song which was to become Council Skies, but it wasn't called Council Skies. There's a bit in the song when I was writing it, where a phrase was missing - I didn't know what that phrase was gonna be." He went on to say: "Pete's book happened to be on my coffee table at home. So I called him up and said, Can I use this title? And he said yeah. And I rewrote the song and then subsequently a lot of other things started to fall into place.".

Singles
On 31 October 2022, the song "Pretty Boy" was released as the first single. On 17 January 2023, "Easy Now" was released as the album's second single.

Track listing

References

2023 albums
Albums produced by Paul Stacey
Noel Gallagher's High Flying Birds albums
Upcoming albums